Warlock Lord or Lord Warlock may refer to:
 "Warlock Lord" , a character from Shannara
 "Warlock Lord", a character from the videogame Shadowgate
 "Warlock Lord", a character from the videogame Shadowgate 64: Trials of the Four Towers
 "Lord Warlock", a character from the anime Genesis Survivor Gaiarth
 "Lord-Warlock", a character from Warhammer's Skaven (Warhammer)

See also
 Warlock (disambiguation)
 Lord (disambiguation)